Hakuchi can refer to:
 Hakuchi Adyghe, a minority dialect of Adyghe spoken in Turkey.
 Hakuchi, a tribe of the Adyghe people.
 The Idiot (1951 film) (Hakuchi), a film directed by Akira Kurosawa.
 Hakuchi (1999 film), a film starring Tadanobu Asano.
 Hakuchi (era), the Japanese name for the years 650–654.